Tommaso Lancisi (1603–1682) was an Italian painter, active in a Baroque style. He was born and active in Borgo San Sepolcro. He was a pupil of Raffaello Scaminozzi. He had two brothers who were also painters: Vincenzio and Matteo.

Sources
Abecedario pittorico (1753) By Pellegrino Antonio Orlandi, Pietro Guarienti, Page 475.

People from Sansepolcro
1603 births
1682 deaths
17th-century Italian painters
Italian male painters
Painters from Tuscany
Italian Baroque painters